Ruben Donet Gregori (born ) is a Spanish male  track cyclist, riding for the national team. He competed in the track time trial event at the 2004 Summer Olympics. He also competed at the 2007 UCI Track Cycling World Championships and 2011 UCI Track Cycling World Championships.

References

External links
 Profile at cyclingarchives.com

1983 births
Living people
Spanish track cyclists
Spanish male cyclists
Place of birth missing (living people)
Cyclists at the 2004 Summer Olympics
Olympic cyclists of Spain
People from Gandia
Sportspeople from the Province of Valencia
Cyclists from the Valencian Community